Huaishudian is a transfer station on Line 4 and Line 7 of the Chengdu Metro in China. It was opened on 2 June 2017.

Station layout

Gallery

References

Railway stations in Sichuan
Railway stations in China opened in 2017
Chengdu Metro stations